The 1972 Tour de Romandie was the 26th edition of the Tour de Romandie cycle race and was held from 10 May to 14 May 1972. The race started and finished in Geneva. The race was won by Bernard Thévenet.

General classification

References

1972
Tour de Romandie
Tour de Romandie